The 2020–21 Port Vale F.C. season was the club's 109th season in the English Football League, and fourth consecutive season in EFL League Two. The season covers the period from 1 July 2020 to 30 June 2021. Though no honours were won on the pitch, Port Vale were named as Community Club of the Year at the 2021 EFL Awards for their work helping the local area during the COVID-19 pandemic.

Going into his second full season as the club's manager, John Askey kept largely the same squad that finished just outside the play-offs in 2019–20, signing just seven players before the season kicked off in September. No fans were allowed to attend matches due to the ongoing COVID-19 pandemic in the United Kingdom. Vale exited the EFL Cup at the second round but were second in the league by the end of September. Four wins and three defeats in seven games saw them maintain a play-off place in October. However they lost six matches in November, causing them to exit the FA Cup at the first round to non-League King's Lynn Town and drop firmly into mid-table in the league. Pressure built over the Christmas period as Vale ended the year 16th in the table and Askey left the club on 4 January, two days after a 4–0 defeat to Mansfield Town. Danny Pugh spent the rest of the month as caretaker-manager, overseeing comprehensive victories over Grimsby Town and Southend United as well as an exit from the EFL Trophy and two defeats in games he was unable to attend due to him testing positive for COVID-19.

David Flitcroft was appointed as the club's first ever director of football in February and Darrell Clarke was signed from Walsall as the club's new manager. It took Clarke eight games to get his first win as Vale manager, but it was followed by another two consecutive victories, which left Vale nine points clear of the relegation zone going into April. The winning run continued and 16 out of a possible 18 points were secured in April, with just a single goal conceded. Clarke released all 15 out of contract players at the end of the season and placed a further three contracted players on the transfer-list.

Overview

EFL League Two
On 7 July 2020, manager John Askey made his first summer signing in 22-year old striker Devante Rodney, who had been released by Salford City. Two weeks later he brought in versatile right-back Zak Mills, who had been released by Oldham Athletic, in order to provide competition for James Gibbons. Tom Pope began the season with a six match ban after a Twitter post he made in January was judged to have amounted to Antisemitic canard. Askey meanwhile continued to strengthen the squad, bringing in midfielder Danny Whitehead, who had also played under Askey at Macclesfield Town and had just been released from Salford City. The club kit was revealed later that week, the unique “V” patterned home strip having partly designed by Robbie Williams, club owner Carol Shanahan and her son Patrick. Askey looked at a number of players on trial during pre-season, including free agents Dino Visser, Harvey Bradbury, Rhys Lovett, Ethan Beckford and David Fitzpatrick, as well as Nottingham Forest academy player Kieran Hayes. However the next signing, a fourth and final striker, was Theo Robinson, who had played for the club in 2016. He also signed trialist left-back David Fitzpatrick, another of his former charges at Macclesfield, on a one-year deal. He completed the squad with goalkeeper Dino Visser, who "did everything asked of him" in his trial. However winger Rhys Browne left the club by mutual consent, citing family reasons; Askey said that "it was a shame because he was doing well". Askey looked to replace him quickly by bringing in Harry McKirdy (free agent) and Ryan McLean (Newcastle Town) on trial and went on to sign McKirdy to a one-year deal.

Vale opened the season with a convincing 2–0 home win over Crawley Town on 12 September, Mark Cullen scoring both of the goals; this extended the club's record of not losing a league opening fixture since 2004. The following week they travelled to St James Park, home of the previous season's play-off finalists, and picked up another 2–0 win, with Tom Conlon scoring a goal and providing the assist for Rodney's first goal for the club. Port Vale met Harrogate Town in a league fixture for the first time on 29 September and the two teams played out a 0–0 draw in a hard-fought game. Askey was nominated for the EFL League Two Manager of the Month award as the team had secured seven points from nine without conceding a goal.

Going into October, Vale were beaten 1–0 at Morecambe after Shaun Brisley gave away a soft penalty with 14 minutes left to play; after the game opposition manager Derek Adams stated that the gameplan had been to stop Luke Joyce getting on the ball and to play on the counter attack. With right-back James Gibbons sidelined with a long-term injury, Askey brought in Leicester City full-back Mitch Clark for his third loan spell at the club. He started at home to Carlisle United on 10 October, a game in which Vale lost 1–0 after Rodney missed a free header and Pope missed a penalty. They got back to winning ways at home to Paul Scholes's Salford City; Scott Brown saved a penalty and Cristian Montaño went on to score the game's only goal with four minutes left to play. However they fell to a 3–1 defeat at league leaders Cambridge United three days later, with Paul Mullin claiming a hat-trick. A trip to struggling Oldham Athletic followed and Vale claimed all three points from Boundary Park thanks to goals from Nathan Smith and Mitch Clark. They went on to pick up back-to-back wins after coming from a goal down to claim a 2–1 home victory over Cheltenham Town. A brace from Pope on Halloween saw the Vale win at bottom-placed Southend United.

On 14 November, Vale fell to a 4–3 home defeat to Tranmere Rovers; they had been leading 2–0 at half-time but the game changed in the away side's favour after Joyce was sent off on 52 minutes. The game had many talking points besides the sending off, including a goal disallowed for either side, a penalty for either side and the way Vale reacted to going a man down. Three days later Vale would lose 1–0 to Scunthorpe United thanks to a superb strike from Abo Eisa. A third consecutive league defeat followed as Vale failed to hold on to a 0–0 draw at league leaders Newport County after Leon Legge was sent off for picking up two yellow cards; Newport's goal was scored six minutes into injury-time by 41-year old Kevin Ellison. Second-from-bottom Stevenage seemed like the perfect place to end the losing run, but Vale were beaten 2–1. They finished off the month by losing 3–2 at home to Leyton Orient, conceding the winning goal five minutes from time.

The trip to Bolton Wanderers on 5 December saw an away side on a run of five defeats visit a side on a six game winning spell. Vale defied the odds to a record a 6–3 victory, in a game with nine different goalscorers, becoming the first away side to score six goals at the University of Bolton Stadium. The next week Vale outperformed Colchester United but only held on to the lead for seven minutes after allowing the away side to equalise after a lapse in defensive concentration. Another 1–1 home draw with a play-off team followed, this time Forest Green Rovers equalising just seven minutes after Vale opened the scoring with an own goal. The team's trip to Walsall's Bescot Stadium started excellently as they led 2–0 at half-time, however the home side made four changes during the break and equalised after 11 minutes and despite Rodney putting Vale back in front, Walsall went on to win the game 4–3 after Jake Scrimshaw and Dan Scarr completed second half braces. Barrow then inflicted a Boxing day defeat on the side at Vale Park, with former loanee Scott Quigley opening the scoring thanks to an assist from former Vale captain Antony Kay; after the match Askey admitted that "the wheels have just fallen off" the club's promotion campaign as they slipped to 17th in the table. He named three academy players on the bench at Valley Parade on 29 December, as Vale saw out 2020 with a 0–0 draw with Bradford City.

The new year began with a 4–0 defeat at Mansfield Town thanks to a Jordan Bowery hat-trick and Legge being sent off for the second time of the season; speaking in his post-match interview, Askey alluded to "a lot of strange happenings going", saying that "it’s not a level playing field at the moment". This proved to be Askey's last game in charge and he left the club on 4 January, with coach Danny Pugh stepping in as caretaker-manager. Pugh made Conlon the new club captain. Pugh selected a 4–4–2 formation for first game in charge, a 3–0 home win over Grimsby Town that proved to be a stark contrast to their defeat seven days previously. The club then signed Jake Taylor, a 22-year old midfielder who had impressed on loan from Nottingham Forest the previous season, to a three-and-a-half-year deal. With Pope ruled out injured for the rest of the season, the club also brought in striker Kurtis Guthrie after he secured his release from Bradford City. In order to comply with EFL squad limit rules the club deregistered Harry McKirdy and Theo Robinson so as to make room for the two new signings. Guthrie started on the bench at Forest Green Rovers on 16 January, which ended as a 1–1 draw following a late equalising goal from Rodney. However two days later, Pugh had to start self-isolation after testing positive for COVID-19; his assistants – Frank Sinclair, Billy Paynter and Anthony Griffith took over first-team duties in his absence. They oversaw a 3–1 defeat to Walsall in which Brown played poorly and allowed a weak back-pass to bobble over his foot and into the back of the net. The bad run continued at Scunthorpe, as poor defending allowed a brace from Ryan Loft to condemn Vale to a 2–0 loss; stand-in manager Frank Sinclair said that "it wasn’t good enough, especially the first half". Pugh returned to the touchline in time to oversee a 5–1 victory over bottom-club Southend United, who Pope described as "the worst professional side I have ever seen". On transfer deadline day the club signed 19-year old centre-back Mustapha Olagunju on loan from Huddersfield Town and 20-year old striker Will Swan on loan from Nottingham Forest.

The search for a new manager continued into February, with David Flitcroft and John McGreal seen as the two front-runners for the position. The team went on to lose 3–1 at Tranmere, with James Vaughan scoring a brace. Flitcroft was appointed as the club's first ever director of football on 8 February. Seven days later Darrell Clarke was announced as the club's new manager, with Walsall being paid a compensation fee. His first match in charge was a 1–1 draw at Leyton Orient, in which he was pleased with his team's effort. His first home match was a goalless draw with Stevenage, after which he commented that "Effort and commitment - excellent. But nowhere near good enough for me on the quality". The league leaders, Cambridge, left Burslem with three points after an excellent late strike from Liam O'Neil.

On 2 March, Vale were beaten 1–0 at Salford, and lost both Gibbons and Montaño to hamstring injuries. A trip to league leaders Cheltenham Town four days later saw the team two goals down within the opening 20 minutes, with Brown – who had publicly criticised many of his teammates in the week – having scored an own goal; Vale would lose the game 3–2 despite Will Swan and Alex Hurst scoring their first Football League goals in the late stages. Vale dominated at home to Oldham Athletic on 9 March, but failed to convert any of their chances as the game ended 0–0, with Clarke bemoaning his side's lack of ruthlessness and musing that "we led the horse to a lot of water there didn't we?". Afetr the game Clarke announced that experienced coach Andy Crosby had been added to the staff, whilst there would be a ban on players speaking to the media until the end of the campaign. However the losing run continued as Bolton Wanderers came away from Vale Park with a 1–0 win, after which Clarke encouraged players who were unwilling to fight for the club to tell him so as "we look them in the eye sometimes and just get the feeling they are not really fancying this". Clarke finally got his first win as Port Vale manager on 16 March as Colnon and Rodney fired Vale to a 2–1 home win over Newport County, and after the match said "the players tonight deserve all the plaudits". Rodney then went on to score the only goal of the game at Colchester to put the Vale ten points clear of the relegation zone. A 3–1 victory at Crawley Town all but guaranteed safety from relegation and earned the team praise from opposition manager John Yems. Following the match it was confirmed that Zak Mills would miss the rest of the season due to injury, and the club gained special dispensation from the EFL to re-register Harry McKirdy to the 22-man squad in his place.

Robinson ended his 19 game long goal drought two minutes into the home game with Exeter City on 2 April, which ended up giving the Vale a 1–0 victory that Clarke dedicated to the memory of recently deceased former defender Lee Collins. Rebecca Welch became the first woman to be appointed to referee an EFL fixture for Vale's trip to Harrogate Town on 5 April, and she oversaw a fifth consecutive win for the away side with Guthrie scoring his first goal in 15 games for the club to wrap up a 2–0 win. A 1–0 home victory over play-off hopefuls Morecambe extended the winning run to six games; the match was halted for 30 minutes in the first half due to heavy snowfall. On 13 April, Manny Oyeleke, whose contract was due to expire in the summer, was allowed to leave the club to join National League play-off chasing Chesterfield. The six-game winning run – the club's longest winning streak since March 1996 – came to an end with a goalless draw at play-off hopefuls Carlisle United. A brace from Colon, including a wonder strike to open the scoring, was enough to win 2–0 at Barrow. A 2–1 win over Bradford City kept the unbeaten run going, though Clayton Donaldson's consolation goal brought Vale's five match clean sheet streak to an end.

Vale's nine-game unbeaten came to an end with a 1–0 defeat at already-relegated Grimsby Town after Matt Green capitalised on an under-hit back-pass from Joyce; Montaño was sent off late in the game after receiving a second yellow card for dissent. The season came to an end with a 3–0 defeat to Mansfield Town as a number of changes were made to the starting eleven, after which Clarke commented that "I can’t wait to get rid of the deadwood if I am honest". Two days later, Clarke released all 15 out of contract players: Brisley, Brown, Ryan Campbell-Gordon, Adam Crookes, Cullen, Fitzpatrick, Guthrie, Joyce, McKirdy, Mills, Montaño, Pope, Scott, Daniel Trickett-Smith and Visser. He also transfer-listed Robinson, Whitehead and Scott Burgess.

Finances
The season began with no fans allowed into any grounds across the English Football League due to the ongoing COVID-19 pandemic in England, with initial plans were to see crowds return to stadiums in October. However these plans were halted due to a rise in cases nationally in September. Port Vale fans bought around 4,000 season tickets regardless, the same as during the previous season, and shirt sales were also at a record high; chairperson Carol Shanahan said that "the club are overwhelmed and beyond grateful in the trust and support we have been shown by Port Vale fans". By 31 March, the club had sold 11,000 replica shirts – 6,000 of which were black away kit – as compared to 3,800 sales the previous season. The club was given the Community Club of the Year (Overall & Midlands) awards at the 2021 EFL Awards for "a staggering 300,000 food parcels and 6,000 phone calls delivered to those in need during the pandemic", whilst club president and former manager John Rudge was given the Contribution to League football award. The club earned £270,983 of net revenue from the EFL's iFollow service. The Shanahan's had to invest over £1 million into the club to make up for the shortfall from playing behind closed doors.

Cup competitions
Port Vale were drawn at home to King's Lynn Town (National League) in the first round of the FA Cup, the first ever meeting between the two clubs. Vale lost the game 1–0 as King's Lynn claimed their first clean sheet of the season.

The first round draw of the EFL Cup was made by Paul Merson and set Port Vale away at Scunthorpe United (League Two). Vale won the tie with Zac Mills and Theo Robinson scoring debut goals in a 2–1 win. The draw for both the second and third rounds were confirmed simultaneously, and guaranteed the club a home tie with Everton (Premier League) or Salford City (League Two) if they managed to first overcome Fleetwood Town (League One). Askey made ten changes against Fleetwood and was encouraged by his team's performance in a 2–1 defeat.

The regional group stage draw for the EFL Trophy placed Port Vale in a group with Tranmere Rovers (League Two), Wigan Athletic (League One) and Liverpool under-21s. They drew their home fixture with Tranmere Rovers 0–0 and Visser went on to save three penalties in the shoot-out to secure two points for the Vale. They effectively booked their place into the next round with a 3–1 victory at Wigan Athletic, in which Robinson scored a brace. Vale finished top of the group with a 4–2 home win over Liverpool U21. They then advanced into the third round with a 2–1 win over Wolverhampton Wanderers U21. In the third round, an away tie at League One giants Sunderland proved too much for a Vale side with seven changes from their last league fixture, as the "Black Cats" claimed a 2–0 victory; it was later revealed that Pope broke his arm with 19 minutes left to play and he carried on playing until the full-time whistle.

Results

Pre-season

EFL League Two

League table

Results summary

Results by matchday

Matches

FA Cup

EFL Cup

EFL Trophy

Squad statistics

Appearances and goals

Top scorers

Disciplinary record

Awards

Transfers

Transfers in

Transfers out

Loans in

Loans out

References

Port Vale
Port Vale F.C. seasons